Paul Redding is an Australian philosopher and professor of philosophy at the University of Sydney. He is known for his research on Kantian philosophy and the tradition of German idealism and its relation to analytic philosophy and pragmatism.
He is a fellow of the Australian Academy of the Humanities.

Education 
Redding earned his Ph.D. in 1984 from the University of Sydney.

Bibliography 

 Redding, P. (2016). Thoughts, Deeds, Words, and World: Hegel's Idealist Response to the Linguistic "Metacritical Invasion". Noesis Press imprint of Davies Group, Publishers.
 Redding, P. (2009). Continental Idealism: Leibniz to Nietzsche. Abingdon: Routledge imprint of Taylor & Francis.
 Redding, P. (2007). Analytic Philosophy and the Return of Hegelian Thought. Cambridge: Cambridge University Press.
 Bubbio, P., Redding, P. (2012). Religion After Kant: God and Culture in the Idealist Era. Newcastle upon Tyne: Cambridge Scholars Publishing.
 Hegel's Hermeneutics (Cornell University Press, 1996)
 The Logic of Affect (Cornell University Press,  1999)

References

External links
 Redding's Personal Website
 Redding at the University of Sydney

21st-century Australian philosophers
20th-century Australian philosophers
University of New South Wales alumni
University of Sydney alumni
Academic staff of the University of Sydney
Continental philosophers
Living people
Nietzsche scholars
Philosophers of religion
Hegelian philosophers
Kantian philosophers
Year of birth missing (living people)